The face value, sometimes called nominal value, is the value of a coin, bond, stamp or paper money as printed on the coin, stamp or bill itself by the issuing authority.

The face value of coins, stamps, or bill is usually its legal value. However, their market value need not bear any relationship to the face value. For example, some rare coins or stamps may be traded at prices considerably above their face value. Coins may also have a salvage value due to more or less valuable metals that they contain.

Overview
The face value of bonds usually represents the principal or redemption value. Interest payments are expressed as a percentage of face value. Before maturity, the actual value of a bond may be greater or less than face value, depending on the interest rate payable and the perceived risk of default. As bonds approach maturity, actual value approaches face value.

In the case of stock certificates, face value is the par value of the stock. In the case of common stock, par value is largely symbolic. In the case of preferred stock, dividends may be expressed as a percentage of par value.

The face value of a life insurance policy is the death benefit. In the case of so-called "double indemnity" life insurance policies, the beneficiary receives double the face value in case of accidental death.

The face value of property, casualty or health insurance policies is the maximum amount payable, as stated on the policy's face or declarations page.

Face value can be used to refer to the apparent value of something other than a financial instrument, such as a concept or plan.  In this context, "face value" refers to the apparent merits of the idea, before the concept or plan has been tested.

Face value also refers to the price printed on a ticket to a sporting event, concert, or other event (the price the ticket was originally sold for by the organization hosting the event). The practice of re-selling tickets for more than face value (or a certain amount above face value) is commonly known as ticket scalping.

Taking someone at face value is assuming another person's suggestion, offer, or proposal is sincere, rather than a bargaining ploy.

See also

 Denomination (currency)
 Denomination (postage stamp)
 Gresham's law
 Nominal value
 Par value
 Place value
 Token money

References

 
 
 

Numismatic terminology
Philatelic terminology